Joseph Venne (1858–1925) was a prominent Canadian architect whose practice was located in Montreal, Quebec. During a long and distinguished career he designed more than sixty buildings in the Montreal area and three large catholic churches in Massachusetts.

Early life and architectural training
Born in Montreal in 1858, he quickly established himself into the network of prominent architects who erected buildings for most French-speaking Montrealers.

Architectural practice

Mr. Venne was architect for over a hundred buildings, including several churches, schools and the famous National Monument. His buildings incorporated innovative use of materials such as steel, concrete and glass. 
He helped found what would become of the Ordre des architectes du Québec, as well as developing a building code of the City of Montreal to establish standards of quality and safety.

Works include
 Church of the Sacred Heart of Jesus, 1887
 College of Philosophy, Côte-des-Neiges, 1890
 La Banque du Peuple, 1893
 Monument-National, 1891
 Laval University of Montreal, 1893
 Church of St. Clement Viauville, 1899
 Église Sainte-Anne-des-Plaines, 1901
 Facade for the church of Saint-Enfant-Jésus du Mile-End, 1902
 St. Anthony Church, New Bedford, Massachusetts USA, 1902
 Church of Saint-Michel, Percé Canada, 1903
 Church of Verdun, 1905
 Presbytery of Hochelaga, 1906
 Orphanage Saint-Arsène, 1906
 Grey Nuns Motherhouse, Saint-Matthieu wing
 School Salaberry, 1907
 Church of Our Lady of Sorrows, Verdun, 1911
 Church of St. Catherine, 1912
 Church of Saint-Denis, Plateau Mont-Royal, 1913
 Church of St. Anselm, 1913
 Notre Dame Church, Southbridge, Massachusetts USA, 1916
 Church Saint-Pierre-Claver, 1917

References

External
Historic Places of Canada

1858 births
1925 deaths
Canadian architects
Canadian ecclesiastical architects
Romanesque Revival architects
Architects of Roman Catholic churches
Architects from Montreal
French Quebecers
Burials at Notre Dame des Neiges Cemetery